Lee Yu-chan (Hangul: 이유찬; born August 5, 1998) is a South Korean professional baseball infielder who is currently playing for the Doosan Bears of the KBO League. His major position is shortstop. He graduated from Bugil Academy and was selected for the Doosan Bears by a draft in 2017 (2nd draft, 5th round).

References

External links 
 Career statistics and player information from the KBO League

1998 births
Living people
Sportspeople from Incheon
South Korean baseball players
KBO League infielders
Doosan Bears players